Benny Van Brabant (born 8 May 1959) is a Belgian former professional racing cyclist. He rode in three editions of the Tour de France, two editions of the Giro d'Italia and six editions of the Vuelta a España.

Career achievements

Major results

1981
 1st Omloop van het Zuidwesten
 5th Brussels–Ingooigem
 7th Overall Tour de Luxembourg
1982
 1st Stage 4b Ronde van Nederland
 4th Omloop Het Volk
 8th Grand Prix de Wallonie
1983
 7th Grand Prix de Wallonie
 9th Rund um den Henninger Turm
1984
 1st Binche–Tournai–Binche
 Tour de l'Avenir
1st  Points classification
1st Stages 2 & 6
 1st Stage 1b Critérium du Dauphiné Libéré
 6th National Road Race Championships
 8th Trofeo Laigueglia
1985
 1st Stages 3 & 7a Critérium du Dauphiné Libéré
 1st Stages 2 & 3 Tour de Picardie
 6th Druivenkoers-Overijse
 8th De Brabantse Pijl
 8th Le Samyn
1986
 1st Stages 1, 3 & 4b Vuelta a Murcia
 1st Stage 2b Vuelta a Burgos
 9th Overall Vuelta a Andalucía
1st Stage 5a
1987
 3rd Nice–Alassio
1989
 1st Stage 4 Vuelta a Castilla y León
 1st Stage 5 Volta a Portugal
 9th Overall Vuelta a Andalucía
1990
 1st Stage 7 Vuelta a España
 3rd Overall Vuelta a Aragón
1991
 2nd Tour du Nord-Ouest
 4th Le Samyn
 5th Dwars door België
 5th De Brabantse Pijl
 7th Paris–Brussels
 7th Scheldeprijs
 8th Grand Prix de Wallonie
1992
 1st Stage 3 Circuit Cycliste Sarthe
 6th De Brabantse Pijl
 8th Le Samyn
 8th Binche–Tournai–Binche
 9th Scheldeprijs

Grand Tour general classification results timeline

References

External links

1959 births
Living people
Belgian male cyclists
Sportspeople from Hasselt
Cyclists from Limburg (Belgium)
Belgian Vuelta a España stage winners
20th-century Belgian people